Shawangunk Correctional Facility is a maximum security prison for males located in the Town of Shawangunk, Ulster County, New York in the United States. The facility lies just outside the Ulster County hamlet of Wallkill, whose post office serves it.

History 
The prison was constructed in 1983 to expand the maximum security capabilities of the state prison system and was located near the existing Wallkill Correctional Facility, a medium security prison.  The co-location was designed so that services by both facilities could be shared, thus reducing the costs of each prison.  

The new prison opened in 1985 and was fully operational by 1986.  The prison is also one of the few in the system with a sex offender program.  Occupational training is provided in the category of building maintenance with specific training in carpentry, electricity and plumbing.

Notable inmates
David Berkowitz, better known as Son of Sam, serial killer who confessed to killing six people and wounding several others in New York City during 1976-1977
Santino Boderick, member of GS9, sentenced in 2017 to 117.5-130 years after being convicted of gang-related violence, including attempted murder, that took place in Brooklyn, New York between January 2013 and December 2014.  
Larry Davis, tried for the attempted murder of a police officer and acquitted by pleading self-defense; later convicted in an unrelated murder of a drug dealer and sentenced to 25 years-to-life; died in prison in a stabbing by a fellow inmate 
Robert Chambers, who pled guilty to the manslaughter of Jennifer Levin and served a sentence of 15 years; after release he was convicted of drug crimes, for which he eventually received a new sentence of 19 years
David Gilbert, member of the radical Weather Underground Organization; sentenced in 1983 to 75 years-to-life (later commuted to 40-to-life) on three counts of felony murder in the 1981 Brinks robbery. Paroled, 2021.

References

External links 
 New York State Department of Corrections and Community Supervision

Prisons in New York (state)
Buildings and structures in Ulster County, New York
Economy of Ulster County, New York
Shawangunk, New York
Government buildings completed in 1983
1983 establishments in New York (state)